The 2021–22 season is the 52nd season in the existence of FC Utrecht and the club's 52nd consecutive season in the top flight of Dutch football. In addition to the domestic league, FC Utrecht participated in this season's editions of the KNVB Cup. In the regular season, they have qualified for the play-offs, for this they played for a place in the second round of the UEFA Europa Conference League.

Players

First-team squad

Transfers

Summer

Transfers in

Transfers out

Winter

Transfers in

Transfers out

Outside transfer window

Transfers in

Pre-season and friendlies

Competitions

Overall record

Eredivisie

League table

Results summary

Results by round

Matches
The league fixtures were announced on 11 June 2021.

KNVB Cup

Play-offs 
Semi-finals

Statistics

Goalscorers 
Friendlies

Assists

Monthly Awards

Attendance

Home games

Away supporters

References

External links
 

FC Utrecht seasons
FC Utrecht